Robert Wayne Thomason (5 November 1952 in Tulsa, Oklahoma, U.S. – 5 November 1995 in Paris, France) was an American mathematician who worked on algebraic K-theory. His results include a proof that all infinite loop space machines are in some sense equivalent, and progress on the Quillen–Lichtenbaum conjecture.

Thomason did his undergraduate studies at Michigan State University, graduating with a B.S. in mathematics in 1973. He completed his Ph.D. at Princeton University in 1977, under the supervision of John Moore.  From 1977 to 1979 he was a C. L. E. Moore instructor at the Massachusetts Institute of Technology, and from 1979 to 1982 he was a Dickson Assistant Professor at the University of Chicago. After spending a year at the Institute for Advanced Study, he was appointed as faculty at Johns Hopkins University in 1983.

Thomason suffered from diabetes; in early November 1995, just shy of his 43rd birthday, he went into diabetic shock and died in his apartment in Paris.

Publications

 Erratum

References

External links

20th-century American mathematicians
1952 births
1995 deaths
Mathematicians from Oklahoma
Princeton University alumni
Deaths from diabetes
Massachusetts Institute of Technology School of Science faculty
University of Chicago faculty
Topologists
People from Tulsa, Oklahoma
Michigan State University alumni
Institute for Advanced Study people
Johns Hopkins University faculty
Sloan Research Fellows